Pariambus is a genus of amphipod crustaceans comprising the two species Pariambus typicus and Pariambus minutus.

References

Corophiidea
Taxa named by Thomas Roscoe Rede Stebbing